Trevor Gifford Nash (3 May 1930; 12 August 2016) was Archdeacon of Basingstoke from 1982 to 1990.

Nash was educated at Haileybury College; Clare College, Cambridge; Ripon College Cuddesdon. After curacies in Cheshunt and Kingston upon Thames he was Priest in charge at Stevenage. He was Vicar of Leagrave from Luton 1963 to 1967; Senior Chaplain at St George's Hospital from 1967 to 1973; and Rector of St Lawrence with St Swithun, Winchester from 1973 to 1982.

Notes

1930 births
People educated at Haileybury and Imperial Service College
Alumni of Clare College, Cambridge
Alumni of Ripon College Cuddesdon
Archdeacons of Basingstoke
2016 deaths